"Can't Stop" is a song and lead single by South Korean rock band CNBLUE from their fifth Korean mini-album Can't Stop. The music video was released on February 24, 2014.

Composition
"Can't Stop" was composed by CNBLUE vocalist Jung Yong-hwa and Heaven Light.

Promotions
.

Music video
The first teaser for the music video was released on February 19, 2014 and the second on February 21, 2014. The full music video was then released on February 24, 2014.

Chart performance

References

2014 singles
CNBLUE songs
2014 songs
Songs written by Jung Yong-hwa